WLSW (105.5 FM) is a radio station broadcasting a Christian music format. Licensed to Salisbury, Maryland, United States, the station is currently owned by Educational Media Foundation.

External links

K-Love radio stations
Educational Media Foundation radio stations
Radio stations established in 1983
1983 establishments in Maryland
LSW